Santos is a 2008 Spanish-Chilean comedy film directed and written by Nicolás López which stars Javier Gutiérrez, Elsa Pataky, Leonardo Sbaraglia, and Guillermo Toledo. Billed as a "romantic comedy about the end of the world", it is López's sophomore feature after Promedio rojo. Boasting a budget of around $6 million, it turned out to be a "monumental bust".

Plot 
An interdimensional traveller known as Antropomosco discloses to comic book artist Salvador Santos the real identity of the latter's friend Arturo Antares as that of the supervillain Nova. Santos undergoes the hero's journey to rescue love interest Laura Luna from Nova's grip.

Cast

Production 
Santos is a Boomerang Cine, Telecinco Cinema and Sobras Producciones production.  and Eduardo Campoy were credited as producers. The film boasted a reported budget of around $6 million. Shooting locations included Santiago, Madrid, and Tokyo.

Release 
The film made its world premiere at the Austin-based Fantastic Fest on 20 September 2008. It also screened in competition at the Sitges Film Festival on 4 October 2008. Distributed by Buena Vista, it was theatrically released in Spain on 10 October 2008. It opened in Chile on 18 December 2008.

Reception 
Alberto Luchini of El Mundo rated the film 1 out of 5 stars, considering that it brings an "interesting visual proposal", on top of "a story that borders on the embarrassing", featuring "a frankly unpleasant preadolescent and scatological sense of humor", with jokes that are not only unfunny, but "repugnant" too.

Jordi Costa of El País wrote that [with the film] "it seems that Nicolás López places his omnivorous voracity of popular culture references at the service of a kind of unbridled and (self-)caricatured autobiography".

Acknowledging the failure of the film (in the wake of devastating reviews and underwhelming box-office numbers), Nicolás López deemed the reception to be "a blow to [his] ego".

See also 
 List of Chilean films
 List of Spanish films of 2008

References 

Films shot in Tokyo
Films shot in Chile
Films shot in Madrid
Chilean comedy films
Spanish romantic comedy films
Spanish superhero films
2000s Spanish films
2000s Spanish-language films
2008 romantic comedy films
Telecinco Cinema films
Films about comics
2000s superhero comedy films